Aar Paar is a 1954 Indian Hindi-language noir comedy film. Directed by Guru Dutt, it has music by O.P. Nayyar and lyrics by Majrooh Sultanpuri. Aar-Paar stars Johnny Walker, Shyama, Shakila, Jagdeep, Jagdish Sethi. Raj Khosla and Atma Ram, Guru Dutt's brother assisted Guru Dutt in film direction.

It is written an article by ThePrint, which says "the beauty of Aar Paar's dialogue is that every character speaks in a language that reflects where they're from, their upbringing and education. Instead of one-size-fits-all Hindi, there's a bit of Punjabi, a bit of Parsi, inflections of Urdu, a smattering of street Bambaiyya, some heartland Hindi mixed with clumsy English. That attention to detail not only made the dialogue more authentic to the character, but also to the city of Bombay, long known for its cosmopolitan population."

The film had very popular music. The album of the film was ranked #34 in the list of "Best Bollywood Albums of all time" by Film Companion. It was also named the "Best Album of Golden Era" for the year 1954 in the 7th Mirchi Music Awards, 2014.

Plot 

Kalu is a migrant taxi-driver in Bombay. He has two women who love him and would like to marry him. Kalu first wants to establish himself and become rich, before he can even think of marriage.

Cast 
Guru Dutt as Kalu
Shyama as Nikki
Shakila as Dancer
Johny Walker as Rustam
Jagdeep as Elaichi Sandow
Jagdish Sethi as Lalaji, Nikki's father
Bir Sakhuja as Captain
 V. K. Murthy as Jailor Saxena
Kumkum as a labourer (in song "Kabhi Aar Kabhi Paar"; uncredited)
Noor as Rustam's Girlfriend (Uncredited)
Tun Tun as Rustam's Girlfriend's Mother (Uncredited)

Songs 
All songs were composed by O. P. Nayyar with lyrics by Majrooh Sultanpuri.

In popular culture 
Kabhi Aar Kabhi Paar was sampled by Raghav in Can't Get Enough from his debut album Storyteller (2004).

References

External links 

1950s Hindi-language films
1954 comedy films
1954 films
Film noir
Films directed by Guru Dutt
Films scored by O. P. Nayyar
Films set in Mumbai
Indian black-and-white films
Indian comedy films